Jinchao Xu (许进超, born 1961) is an American-Chinese mathematician. He is currently the Verne M. Willaman Professor in the Department of Mathematics at the Pennsylvania State University, University Park. He is known for his work on multigrid methods, domain decomposition methods, finite element methods, and more recently deep neural networks.

Academic Biography
Xu received his bachelor's degree from the Xiangtan University in 1982, his master's degree from the Peking University in 1984, and his doctoral degree from the Cornell University in 1989. He joined the Pennsylvania State University (Penn State) in 1989 as assistant professor of mathematics, was promoted to associate professor in 1991, and to professor in 1995. He was named a Distinguished Professor of Mathematics in 2007, the Francis R. and Helen M. Pentz Professor of Science in 2010, and the Verne M. Willaman Professor of Mathematics in 2015. He is currently the director of the Center for Computational Mathematics and Applications at Penn State.

Xu serves on the editorial boards of many major journals in computational mathematics and co-edits many conference proceedings and research monographs. He also serves on various college and departmental committees and organizes numerous colloquiums and seminars. He has organized or served as a scientific committee member for more than 65 international conferences, workshops, and summer schools.

Research Interests and Contributions
Xu is an advocate of the idea that practical applications and theoretical completeness and beauty can go together. He studies numerical methods for partial differential equations and big data, especially finite element methods, multigrid methods, and deep neural networks, for their theoretical analysis, algorithmic development, and practical applications. He is well known for many groundbreaking studies in developing, designing, and analyzing fast methods for finite element discretization and for the solution of large-scale systems of equations, including several basic theories and algorithms that bear his name: the Bramble-Pasciak-Xu (BPX) preconditioner, the Hiptmair-Xu (HX) preconditioner, the Xu-Zikatanov (XZ) identity, and the Morley-Wang-Xu (MWX) element. The BPX-preconditioner is one of the two fundamental multigrid algorithms for solving large-scale discretized partial differential equations; the HX-preconditioner, which was featured in 2008 by the U.S. Department of Energy as one of the top 10 breakthroughs in computational science in recent years, is one of the most efficient solvers for the numerical simulation of electro-magnetic problems; the XZ-identity is a basic technical tool that can be used for the design and analysis of iterative methods such as the multigrid method and the method of alternating projections; the MWX-element is the only known class of finite elements universally constructed for elliptic partial differential equations of any order in any spatial dimension. Xu has published nearly 200 research papers, including his famous SIAM Review paper “Iterative Methods by Space Decomposition and Subspace Correction” (1992) and more recently his Acta Numerica paper “Algebraic Multigrid Methods” (2017).

In recent years, Xu has become interested in developing training algorithms for deep learning models and their applications, such as Alzheimer's disease, pathological image recognition, and pulse data analysis. He constructed the connections of ReLU deep neural networks and the classical linear finite element. Xu proposed a new idea for understanding ResNet models from the viewpoint of the multigrid method and also proposed iRDA training algorithms for the training process in CNN, which can achieve a sparse result in this context.

Awards and honors
Xu has published nearly 200 scientific papers and was ranked among the most highly cited mathematicians in the world by the Institute for Scientific Information (ISI) (e.g. top 25 worldwide for the years 1991 to 2001). He was a plenary speaker at the International Congress on Industrial and Applied Mathematics in 2007 and a 45-minute invited speaker at the International Congress of Mathematicians 2010, Hyderabad. In 2011, Xu was honored as a Fellow of the Society for Industrial and Applied Mathematics (SIAM) for his outstanding contributions to the theory and applications of multilevel and adaptive numerical methods. In 2012, he was elected as an inaugural Fellow of the American Mathematical Society (AMS).

Xu received the Liu Memorial Award at Cornell University in 1988, the Natural Science Award from the National Academy of Science in China in 1989, and the Schlumberger Foundation Award in 1993. In 1995, Xu's research accomplishments were recognized with the first Feng Kang Prize for Scientific Computing from the Chinese Academy of Sciences. In honor of his achievements in computational mathematics research and teaching, he received the Humboldt Award for Senior U.S. Scientists in 2005. He also received the Research Award for National Outstanding Youth (Class B) in 2006 in China. In 2019, Xu was named a Fellow of the American Association for the Advancement of Science(AAAS).

References

External links
Homepage of Jinchao Xu at Penn State

20th-century American mathematicians
Mathematicians from Hunan
Living people
Pennsylvania State University faculty
American people of Chinese descent
Fellows of the American Mathematical Society
1961 births
Fellows of the Society for Industrial and Applied Mathematics
Educators from Hunan
21st-century American mathematicians